= List of high commissioners of South Africa to Canada =

== History ==
From 1938 to 1944 the heads of the foreign mission were accredited as Representatives level. From 1945 to 1961 as High Commissioners level, and from 31 May 1961 to 1 June 1994, when South Africa was not a member of the Commonwealth of Nations, the heads of the foreign mission were accredited as ambassadors.

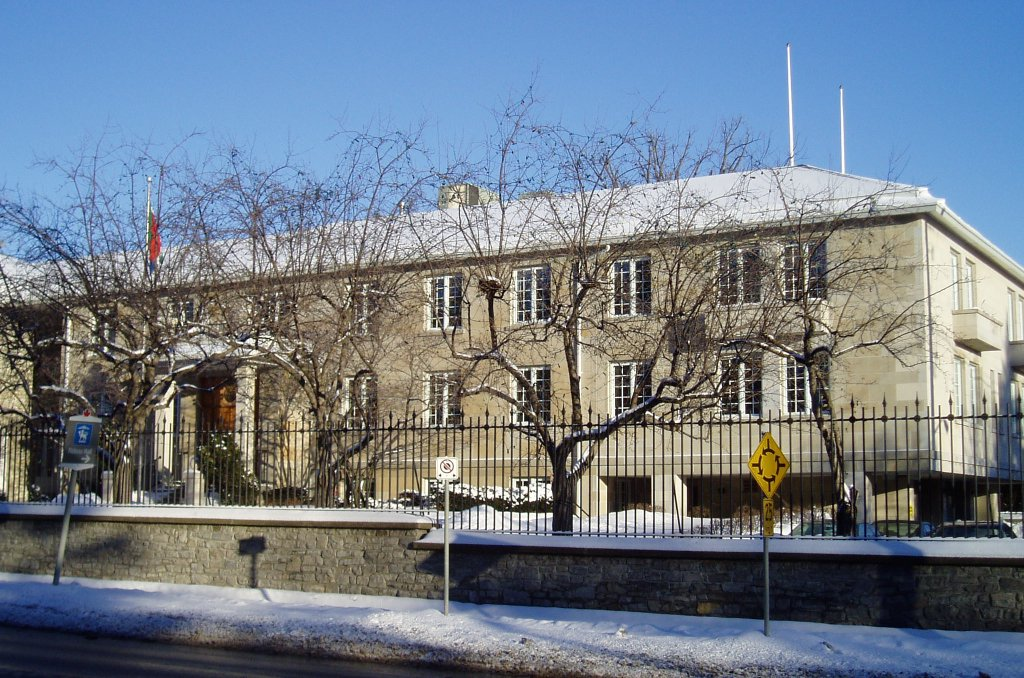
South African High Commission in 15 Sussex Street, Ottawa.

== List of High Commissioners/Diplomatic Representatives of South Africa to Canada: ==
Term Begin	Term End	Title	Name	Notes
1 Apr. 1938	8 Dec. 1944	Representative	David de Waal Meyer	
10 Sept. 1945	19 May 1949	High Commissioner	Philippus Rudolph Viljoen	
13 Aug. 1949	31 Dec. 1953	High Commissioner	Alfred Adrian Roberts	
3 March 1954	1 Aug. 1956	High Commissioner	Wentzel Christoffel du Plessis	
8 Nov. 1956	9 Jan 1959	High Commissioner	Jan Ruiter Jordaan	
15 Apr. 1959	7 Sep. 1959	High Commissioner	Rober Kirsten	
8 Sept. 1959	4 Jul 1960	High Commissioner	Charles Brothers Hilson Fincham	
5 July 1960	30 May 1964	High Commissioner, from 31 May 1961 as Ambassador	Willem Dirkse-van-Schalkwyk	
2 Nov. 1964	11 Nov. 1967	Ambassador	Traugott Johannes Endemann	
28 Feb. 1968	19 May 1970	Ambassador	Barend Johannes van der Walt	
21 July 1970	1973	Ambassador	Matthys Izak Botha	
20 July 1973	1978	Ambassador	Norman John Best	
13 Sept. 1978	1983	Ambassador	John Joubert Becker	
16 Dec. 1983	1985	Ambassador	Hendrik Albertus Geldenhuys	
15 Aug. 1985	1987	Ambassador	Glenn Robin Ware Babb	
12 May 1987	1992	Ambassador	Johannes De Kleck	
5 Feb. 1992	1995	Ambassador	Andre Kilian	
25 Apr. 1995	1999	High Commissioner	Billy Modise	
13 Sept. 1999	2003	High Commissioner	Andre Jacquet	
20 Apr. 2004	2005	High Commissioner	Theresa Mary Solomon	
26 Sept. 2006	2010	High Commissioner	Abraham Sokhaya Nkomo	
8 Feb. 2011	2012	High Commissioner	Mohau Pheko	
13 Sept. 2012	2016	High Commissioner	Membathisi Mdladlana	
2 May 2017	2022	High Commissioner	Sibongiseni Yvonne Dlamini-Mntambo	
27 Apr. 2022	Present	High Commissioner	Rieaz Shaik	
